Marie-Odile is a French feminine given name, composed of Marie and Odile. It may refer to:

 Marie-Odile Bouillé (born 1950), member of the National Assembly of France
 Marie-Odile Marceau, Canadian architect
 Marie-Odile Raymond (born 1973), Canadian cross-country skier
 a character in the 1998 film Madeline

French feminine given names
Compound given names